Håkon Wexelsen (9 August 1898–26 June 1979) was a Norwegian plant geneticist.

He was born at Bærum in Akershus, Norway. He took the dr.agric. degree in 1946, and was a professor at the Norwegian College of Agriculture from 1947 to 1968. He served as rector there from 1957 to 1960.

References

1898 births
1979 deaths
People from Bærum
20th-century Norwegian botanists
Academic staff of the Norwegian College of Agriculture
Rectors of the Norwegian University of Life Sciences